Michael Poole born April 23, 1986 in Cardiff, Wales is a rugby union player. He previously played for Newport Youth, Pontypool RFC Newport RFC and Newport Gwent Dragons. During the 2008–09 season Poole was the Principality Premiership top try scorer with 19 tries for Newport, more than double the amount that he had scored throughout his career at the club.

In October 2013 he joined the Scarlets.

His hobbies include cage fighting.

Newport RFC Record

External links

External links
Newport RFC profile
Newport Gwent Dragons profile

1986 births
Living people
Rugby union wings
Welsh rugby union players
Dragons RFC players
Newport RFC players
Scarlets players
Rugby union players from Cardiff